A thirst trap is a type of social media post intended to entice viewers sexually. It refers to a viewer's "thirst", a colloquialism likening sexual frustration to dehydration, implying desperation, with the afflicted individual being described as "thirsty." Originating around the early 2010s, the meaning has changed over time.

History 

Thirst trap culture was derived from selfie culture.

The term thirst trap emerged on Twitter and Urban Dictionary in 2011, and throughout the years as the rise of Snapchat, Instagram, and online dating apps such as Tinder. In 2011, it was defined by Urban Dictionary as "any statement used to intentionally create attention or 'thirst'."

In 2018, it was reported to have entered common usage, as media sources including The New York Times and GQ started using the expression without definition.

Usage of the term 

Often, the term thirst trap describes an attractive picture of an individual that they post online.

Thirst trap can also describe a digital heartthrob. For instance, Canadian prime minister Justin Trudeau has been described as a political thirst trap.

It has also been described as a modern form of "fishing for compliments".

Motivation 

There can be several motivations behind thirst trapping. People can seek "likes" and comments on social media which can provide a temporary boost in self-esteem and validation. Posting a thirst trap can also be a way to express sexuality. Thirst traps can contribute to personal branding as well. Sometimes, there can be a financial benefit for sharing thirst traps. Some post thirst traps as a way to cope with emotional distress, such as after a breakup. Furthermore, these images can be used to spite a former lover. Sharing a thirst trap has also been used as a way to connect in times of social isolation (e.g. COVID-19 pandemic).

From a physiological standpoint, endorphins and neurotransmitters like oxytocin and dopamine can be released with the process of sharing thirst traps, leading to a sense of pleasure and an ambiguous or masturbatory alternative for actual physical sexual contact.

Methodology 

Methodologies have developed to take an optimal thirst trap photo. Reporting for Vice magazine, Graham Isador found several of his social network contacts spent a lot of time considering how to take the best photo and what text they should use. They considered angles and lighting. Sometimes they made use of the self-timer feature available on some cameras. Often, body parts are put on display without being too explicit (e.g. bulges of male genitalia, breast cleavage, abdominal muscles, pectoral muscles, backs, buttocks).

Often, the thirst trap is accompanied by a caption. For instance, in October 2019, actress Tracee Ellis Ross posted bikini pictures on Instagram with a caption that included the message: "I've worked so hard to feel good in my skin and to build a life that truly matches me and I'm in it and it feels good. ... No filter, no retouch 47 year old thirst trap! Boom!"

On Instagram, #ThirstTrapThursdays is a popular tag. Followers reply in turn after a posting.

Variations 

"Gatsbying" is a variation of the thirst trap, where one puts posts on social media to attract the attention of a particular individual. The term alludes to the novel The Great Gatsby where the character Jay Gatsby would throw extravagant parties to attract the attention of his love interest, Daisy. "Instagrandstanding" is an alternative name for this.

"Wholesome trapping" has developed, where one posts pictures of more meaningful aspects of life, such as spending time with friends or doing outdoor activities.

Criticism 
Psychotherapist Lisa Brateman has criticized thirst traps as being an unhealthy method of receiving external validation. This desire for external validation can be addictive.

Thirst traps can cause pressure to maintain a good physical appearance, and therefore cause self-esteem issues. Additionally, thirst traps are often highly choreographed and thus present a distorted perception of reality. The manufacturing of thirst traps can be limited when one enters a relationship or with time as the body ages.

In some cases, thirst traps can lead to harassment and online bullying. In April 2020, model Chrissy Teigen posted a video of herself wearing a black one-piece swimsuit, and she received a multitude of negative comments that constituted bullying and body shaming.

Notability in culture 

Numerous celebrities have been recognized for their repeated thirst traps, notably Kim Kardashian, Amber Rose, and Rihanna. The Jonas Brothers have also been noted for their thirst traps created over an extended duration. Publications such as BuzzFeed and Vibe have created compilations of 'best' celebrity thirst traps.

Vine was also used as a platform to share thirst trap videos, used by the queer women community in particular. Thirst traps are also prolific in the gay community.

It has been argued that Instagram itself is essentially a representation of a giant thirst trap.

In 2018, Jeffree Star featured a shade of lipstick called "thirst trap".

In 2019, Four Loko commissioned a study where 60,000 Instagram images from 50 U.S. cities and 10 international cities were analyzed to see the prevalence rate of thirst traps. Miami was found to have the highest prevalence rate in the United States, with 36 out of 1,000 photos being thirst traps.

During the COVID-19 pandemic, there was an increase in thirst traps.

During March 2023, the Tennessee Holler news site first broke a political news report of the anti-LGBTQ 79 year old Tennessee Lt. Governor Randy McNally  (Republican-Oak Ridge) using his verified Instagram account to reply with his frequent comments and emojis to the thirst trap photos "showcasing his nearly nude physique" that were posted online by Franklin McClure, a 20 year old gay man from Knoxville, Tennessee.

See also 

 Attention economy

References 

Selfies
2010s slang
Internet culture
Social media
Narcissism
Portrait photography
Self-portraits
2010s neologisms